SS Fred C. Stebbins was a Liberty ship built in the United States during World War II.

Construction
Fred C. Stebbins was laid down on 24 November 1944, under a Maritime Commission (MARCOM) contract, MC hull 2513, by the St. Johns River Shipbuilding Company, Jacksonville, Florida; she was sponsored by Mrs. Fred C. Stebbins, the mother of the namesake, and was launched on 30 December 1944.

History
She was allocated to the Union Sulphur Company, on 11 January 1945. On 16 December 1947, she was laid up in the James River Reserve Fleet, Lee Hall, Virginia. On 21 July 1953, she was withdrawn from the fleet to be loaded with grain under the "Grain Program 1953", she returned loaded on 6 August 1953. On 31 October 1955, she was withdrawn to be unload, she returned reloaded with grain on 7 November 1955. On 26 March 1956, she was withdrawn from the fleet to be unloaded, she returned empty on 20 April 1956. She was transferred to the US Navy, 5 February 1960, for armament testing.

References

Bibliography

 
 
 
 
 

 

Liberty ships
Ships built in Jacksonville, Florida
1944 ships
James River Reserve Fleet
James River Reserve Fleet Grain Program